The Battle of Perez Dasmariñas was a battle of the Philippine Revolution. It occurred during the Cavite Offensive of 1897, commanded by Maj. Gen. Jose de Lachambre under Governor-General Camilo de Polavieja, as the Spanish aimed to recapture Cavite from Katipunan rebel control. Both the battle and the offensive was a success for the Spanish, and the retreat to Montalban occurred several weeks after the battle.

Prelude 
The offensive began on February 15 at the town of Pamplona in Cavite. The Spaniards recaptured the town of Silang with heavy losses on February 19, 1897. and the revolutionaries retreated to Perez Dasmariñas. The Spaniards aimed to retake the rebel center town of Imus and had to take the town of Perez Dasmariñas first.

Battle 
On February 27, the Spaniards began their assault on Perez Dasmariñas and its vicinities. The Katipuneros intercepted the advancing Spaniards in Pasong Santol, a trail at the barrio of Salitran between Imus and Perez Dasmariñas, starting March 7. Meanwhile, at the Tejeros Convention, Aguinaldo was voted in absentia as the president of a reorganized revolutionary government on March 22. The next day, Colonel Vicente Riego de Dios was sent by the assembly to fetch Aguinaldo, who was then in Pasong Santol. The newly elected president refused to come because of the pending attack, so his brother Crispulo Aguinaldo was then sent to fetch him. Crispulo said that the Spanish would only retake the town over his dead body. Aguinaldo thus left and took his oath of office at Santa Cruz de Malabon (now Tanza) that day, Emilio realizing the danger, sent a reinforcement detachment but was intercepted on the way by Captain General Artemio Ricarte under the order of Supremo Andres Bonifacio on the pretext of using the reinforcement to other fronts thus leaving the Pasong Santol front weakened, Crispulo was killed the following day at Pasong Santol and the rebels were routed with heavy losses, with combat reaching the town of Perez Dasmariñas itself. Some survivors managed to get back to Imus.

Outcome 
The battle signaled the advent of the Spanish recapture of Cavite province.

References

See also 
Battle of Binakayan-Dalahican
Ramon Blanco y Erenas
Silang, Cavite

Battles of the Philippine Revolution
History of Cavite
Dasmariñas